De Kat may refer to:

 Frans de Kat (born 1965), Dutch former footballer and coach
 Otto B. de Kat (1907–1995), Dutch painter and art critic
 De Kat, Zaandam, a windmill